Lars Ivar Lerin (born 2 April 1954 in Munkfors) is a Swedish painter and author. He won the August Prize in 2014 for the non-fiction book Naturlära.

Selected bibliography
Naturlära (2014)

References

Swedish painters
Swedish male painters
August Prize winners
1954 births
Living people
Swedish watercolourists
Swedish non-fiction writers
Swedish television people
People from Värmland